Mountaintop or mountain top generally refers to the summit of a mountain.

Mountaintop may also refer to:
 Mountain Top, Pennsylvania

Martin Luther King Jr
 "I've Been to the Mountaintop", the last speech delivered by Martin Luther King, Jr.
 The Mountaintop, a 2009 play by Katori Hall about King

Music
 Mountaintops (album), a 2011 album by Mates of State
 "Mountaintop", song by Relient K on the album Air for Free
 "Mountain Top", tune by Chick Corea from Delphi II & III

See also
 The Mountain (disambiguation)
 Mountaintop removal mining